Doble Kara ( / ) is a 2015 Philippine melodrama television series, directed by Emmanuel Q. Palo, Trina N. Dayrit, and Jojo A. Saguin starring Julia Montes in a dual role, as Kara Dela Rosa and Sara Suarez. It also stars Carmina Villarroel, Mylene Dizon, Ariel Rivera, Allen Dizon, Sam Milby, Alicia Alonzo, Maxene Magalona, Edgar Allan Guzman, and John Lapus in their respective roles. The series premiered on ABS-CBN's Kapamilya Gold afternoon block and worldwide on The Filipino Channel from August 24, 2015, to February 10, 2017, replacing FlordeLiza and Pinoy Big Brother: 737 GOLD. and was replaced by The Better Half. 

The series was met with both positive reviews and strong ratings. The series garnered three PMPC Star Award nominations, winning the Best Daytime Drama Series and two acting nominations for Montes and Villarroel. In addition, the series received multiple award wins, including a TV Series Craze Award for Best Daytime TV Series, an ALTA Media Icon Award for Best Daytime Drama Series, and a Gawad Tanglaw Award for Best Performance by an Actress in a Television Series for Montes.

An English-dubbed version of the series was uploaded on ABS-CBN Entertainment's YouTube channel for its global release for a limited time.

Series overview
 

The story revolves around identical twin sisters who grew up in a happy family in spite of being poor and whose lives will be intertwined because of love, identity, deceit, ambition, and wealth when destiny teasingly compels to separate their lives.

Season 1 (2015)

Identical twin sisters Kara and Sara are separated during their childhood when their parents, Laura and Ishmael give up Kara to her biological father, Antonio and his wife Lucille, to give Kara the opportunity to get the best medical care for her leukemia. Lucille thinks the child is adopted, and is unaware that the child is Antonio's biological daughter. Lucille welcomes and loves Kara with all her heart. The couple brings Kara to America to have her treated for leukemia. Kara never forgets her real family and longs to reunite with them. Fourteen years later, Kara returns to her hometown and finds her family, while Sara pines for the life her twin enjoys. Antonio forbids Kara to reconnect with her family. Sara becomes romantically involved with Edward. Several situations occurs with Lucille and Antonio mistaking Sara for Kara.

Season 2 (2015–16)

The truth of their parentage is revealed and rivalry arises with the twins fighting for their rights and ownership. But even so, Kara's love for her sister is unconditional as she gives in to Sara's wishes, even when she realizes her sister's evil intentions. Sara's personality becomes materialistic and scheming, as she persistently fights for her rights as the "legal daughter" of Antonio. This creates a rivalry between Sara and Lucille. Sara starts to covet for luxurious properties, desiring to outclass Kara and even induces Antonio to buy her own house to make up for all those years she suffered in poverty.

In addition to the conflict and turmoil of her two step daughters, Lucille discovers their family's secrets and her situation turns for the worst when she meets her conniving half-sister Alex and half-brother Sebastian.

Season 3 (2016)
 
Alex and Sebastian made a promise to get back the money which their father supposedly left for them. Alex would do everything to retrieve back what is rightfully theirs. Now, Lucille is against them as well until several circumstances will change their lives when Alex becomes even more desperate for money and she is determined to strike vengeance against Lucille. Eventually, Lucille turned the tables next to her favors when she started a connivance with Alex and assured to pay her handsomely in exchange for her services.

Sara is still hopeless to get back the money from Lucille since she already gave it to Alex. Sara catches Alex but she freely escaped from them but then she was kidnapped by a man ordered by Lucille. The day of confrontation in the court is about to come and Alex is ready to unveil the truth about what really happened to her. Afraid to tell the truth, Alex made a decision not to disclose what really happened to her. In exchange of her silence, Alex was rewarded by Lucille with wealth and money. Sara's dissatisfaction and envy arises again and before Kara and Seb's wedding, Sara seduces her sister's soon-to-be husband and once more begs for his love, but Seb proves that his love is only for Kara.

Season 4 (2016) 
 
A deranged Lucille who keeps on seeing Antonio as an apparition continues with her agenda in ruining the Suarez and taking Kara back to her arms. Lucille, desperate to retrieve back her only daughter and sole memory of Antonio, committed a crime of arson and set the house of the Suarez on fire. She was later pleaded guilty for the crimes she deliberately committed including the accident experienced by the Suarez during their holiday vacation. Instead of imprisoning her, Lucille was placed in a mental hospital by the court, as she had developed late-onset schizophrenia. Hoping to find Edward, the father of her unborn child, Sara went to Japan, but failed miserably just as Chloe, believing that Sara would only bring her son misery and pain, led Sara astray and forced Edward to migrate in South Korea. Sara, with the help of a friend, decided to work and start her life anew in Japan for her baby instead.

Both babies are born, christened as Rebecca and Isabella. However, Sara mourned and grieved as Rebecca shortly died after her birth. After the misfortunes Sara had experienced in Japan, she went home to the Philippines, but chose not to return to her family, thinking that she'll only be a hindrance and be judged by her family because of her wrong decisions in life again. Not long after Isabella's few months, she was unfortunately separated from Kara and Seb which causes a family problem to the Suarez. Nobody knows who intended to kidnap the child and not stopping to search for her. Isabella was left in front of Sara's house under unknown circumstances and she took maternal care for her. Nowhere else to go, Sara was taken in by Cynthia in her Club Felicidad where Sara and Isabella spend over the following years.

Season 5 (2016–17)
 
One night during Becca's celebration for becoming part of Edward's commercial, Chloe, reveals the truth to Edward and the Suarez family. Alex pleased of what fate is doing to Sara, starts to be in triumph due to Sara's misery. Her plan is working when the secrets are revealed and the Suareze's will destroy themselves little by little, and Kara and Sara's relationship will be ruined forever. Kara finds out that Becca is actually her long-lost daughter, who was kidnapped many years ago.

After Sara was pleaded guilty for kidnapping Isabella, she escaped and tries to prove her innocence with the help of Lola Caring, Kengkay, Rona, and Nancy. She is later proven innocent and her relationship with Kara is fixed. The Suarezes then live a happy life without Alex's annoying deferral and evil schemes against them.

Season 6 (2017)

Three months later, Kara and Sara and the whole Suarez family is finally living in peace now that Alex is abroad. Sebastian continues to worry of Alex's state in spite of what she has done. Kara, who wants her family to move on, makes a rule that the whole Suarez family is forbidden to mention Alex's name, to avoid further complications. Meanwhile, Alex, who is currently in Malaysia, gives birth and starts her road to revenge against the Suarezes.

Banjo visits Sara and convinces her to go on a date with him one last time. As they get in the car, Sara notices and finds Alex. An outrageous chase happens and the two got into a wreck. Kara and Sebastian got informed and they send police men to arrest Alex. While waiting, Sara and Banjo have a heart-to-heart talk and finally confess their feelings for each other, while Banjo calls Cynthia and says his final goodbye. Sara escapes to seek help, but as the tragedy struck, the car falls into the gorge and explodes ending Banjo's life. Rebecca and Sara mourn for Banjo's death and, unfortunately, Cynthia blames Sara for Banjo's death and creates a scene at his wake, forcefully drags Sara out and blurting out ill thoughts against her. During Banjo's burial, Rebecca and Kara pay their respects for Banjo, while Sara begs for Cynthia's forgiveness. Also, after being confronted by Sara as a set up by Cynthia and accidentally shooting Seb in the head, Alex pretends to be deranged as part of her plan to escape jail and gets reunited with her half-sister Lucille in a mental institution, and uses Lucille as a tool to resume all of her evil schemes against Kara and Sara's family.

Cast and characters

Main cast 
 Julia Montes as Kara H. Suarez / Kara Hipolito Dela Rosa-Acosta and Sara H. Suarez / Sara H. Dela Rosa-Ligaya (seasons 1–6)
 Jacqui Leus as the Acting double of Julia Montes
 Mylene Dizon as Laura Hipolito-Suarez
 Ariel Rivera as Ishmael Suarez (seasons 1–4)
 Carmina Villarroel as Lucille Acosta-Dela Rosa (seasons 1–4, 6)
 Sam Milby as Sebastian "Seb" Acosta (seasons 2–6)
 John Lapus as Pacito "Itoy" Delgado (seasons 1–4, supporting; seasons 5–6, main)
 Maxene Magalona as Alexandra "Alex" Acosta-Hernandez (seasons 2–4, guest; seasons 5–6, main)
 Edgar Allan Guzman as Edward Ligaya (seasons 1–4, supporting; seasons 5–6, main)
 Rayver Cruz as Banjo Manrique (season 4, guest; seasons 5–6, main)

Supporting cast
 Allen Dizon as Antonio Dela Rosa (seasons 1–4, supporting; season 6, special guest)
 Alicia Alonzo as Barbara Acosta
 Anjo Damiles as Andrew "Andy" Delgado
 Gloria Sevilla as Anita Valdicano (seasons 1–4)
 Krystal Mejes as Isabella "Bella" D. Acosta / Rebecca "Becca" Suarez 
Myel De Leon as Hannah D. Acosta
Mickey Ferriols as Cynthia "Mother" Manrique (season 4, guest; seasons 5–6, supporting)
 Patricia Javier as Chloe Cabrera (seasons 1–4, supporting; season 5, supporting) 
 Alora Sasam as Camille Rose "CR" Sanchez
 Nash Aguas as Paolo Acosta (season 4, recurring; seasons 5–6, supporting)
 Alexa Ilacad as Patricia Hernandez (season 4, recurring; seasons 5–6, supporting)
 Polo Ravales as Julio Hernandez (season 4, guest; season 5, supporting)

Recurring cast
 Loren Burgos as Olivia Ou (seasons 1–3)
 Ramon Christopher as Cong. Dante Ligaya (season 1) 
 Jay Chan Marquez as Greg Borromeo (season 3)
 Michael Conan as Emilio (seasons 1–3)
 Jason Fernandez as Jhayson (seasons 1–4)
 Crisha Uy as Jessica (seasons 1–4)
 Chiqui del Carmen as Lourdes (seasons 2–3)
 Joe Vargas as Elvis (seasons 2–6)
 Yesha Camile as Mikay (seasons 2–3)
 Amy Nobleza as Bebeng (seasons 2–3)
 Andrew Gan as Jeremy (seasons 4–5)
 Luis Hontiveros as Patrick (seasons 4–5)
 Joseph Ison as Gabo (seasons 5–6)
 Marx Topacio as Bogart (seasons 5–6)
 Jeff Luna as Adolfo (season 6)

Guest cast
 Dexie Daulat as Vianne Valera (season 1)
 Frances Makil-Ignacio as Susan Ligaya (season 1)
 Maila Gumila as Lorena Acosta (season 2)
 David Chua as Nestor Castillo (seasons 3–4)
 Maria Isabel Lopez as Rona "Mayora" Mallari (seasons 5–6)
 Kristel Fulgar as Kristine Mae "Kengkay" Dalisay (seasons 5–6)
 Odette Khan as Caridad "Lola Caring" Lacsamana (season 5)
 Simon Ibarra as SPO1 Leandro Arellano (seasons 5–6)

Special participation
Season 1
 Irma Adlawan as Esmeralda "Esme" Hipolito
 Avery Balasbas as young Kara and Sara
 Marco Pingol as young Edward
 Harvey Bautista as young Andy
Season 2
 Trajan Moreno as young Seb
 Alyanna Angeles as young Alex

Production

Casting

In April 2015, it was announced that Julia Montes had been given the first title role of the show. Hazel Parfan, the executive producer of the show, said they concocted the project with Montes in mind. Created as polar opposites, Montes had to change clothes, change makeup, and switch personas several times for her respective roles as Kara and Sara. Afterwards, more castings were confirmed, including Mylene Dizon, Ariel Rivera, Allen Dizon, Edgar Allan Guzman, John Lapus, Gloria Sevilla, Patricia Javier, and Alora Sasam. Bing Loyzaga and Enchong Dee were originally part of the main cast for the roles of Lucille Dela Rosa and Andy Delgado. They were later replaced by Carmina Villarroel and Anjo Damiles.

In November 2015, it was announced that Sam Milby and Maxene Magalona would also be joining the cast as one of Kara's (Montes) love interests and Sebastian's (Milby) sister, respectively. After the third-season finale, it was announced on April 22, 2016, that child actresses Krystal Mejes and Myel De Leon were cast in the second book and fourth season of the series as Isabella Acosta/Rebecca Suarez and Hannah Acosta, respectively. Rayver Cruz, Mickey Ferriols, recently transferred Kapamilya talent Polo Ravales, Nash Aguas and Alexa Ilacad joined the show with Cruz being a series regular.

Scheduling
The series was initially meant to be part of ABS-CBN's Primetime Bida evening block as announced on Bandila news program, declaring that Montes will be coming back on primetime. However, in a last minute change, the time slot was moved as part of Kapamilya Gold afternoon block, replacing Pinoy Big Brother: 737 GOLD, which is the schedule time after FlordeLiza and subsequently after It's Showtime.

Broadcast
Doble Kara aired on Mondays to Fridays at 3:15 p.m. Philippine Standard Time (PST). ABS-CBN pushed the series to an earlier time slot of 2:30 p.m. on August 31, 2015, right after FlordeLiza ended its series run. After this, the series was then again rescheduled to a later time slot of 3:30 p.m. on April 13, 2016.

The series had its world premiere on The Filipino Channel on August 25, 2015. In the Philippines, it premiered on ABS-CBN on August 24, 2015. The premiere also debuted via livestream on TFC's official online service, TFC.tv, and via its video on demand (Internet Protocol television) service available which is subtitled in English for its worldwide viewers from United States, Canada, Europe, Middle East, Australia, New Zealand, and Japan.

Doble Kara aired in Kenya on KTN from Monday to Friday during the 6-7 p.m. prime time slot. Throughout its run, it drew high viewership and acclaim. Following the successful run of Book 1 in 2017 and early 2018, the show made a return in June 2018 with the fourth season succeeding The Better Half, and reruns airing on Saturday evenings from 5 p.m.

In the rest of Africa, the show airs on StarTimes' Novela E1 at 7:50 p.m. Central Africa Time (CAT) every Saturday & Sundays following its premiere on May 28, 2016. In Indonesia, it premiered on MNCTV on January 23, 2017. In Kazakhstan, it premiered on its state television Qazaqstan on February 6, 2017, from Monday to Friday, with Kazakh voice translation and with Russian subtitles.

Reruns
The series began airing re-runs since September 14, 2022 on ALLTV.

Music

The theme song, "Ikaw Ay Ako" (You is Me), composed by songwriter Vehnee Saturno, was sung by The Voice of the Philippines runner-up Klarisse de Guzman and semifinalist Morissette. The song was originally composed for the television series Doble Kara. A second rendition of the song was covered by The Voice Kids grand champions Lyca Gairanod and Elha Nympha for the series' second book. The songs, from different Dreamscape Productions such as Ang Probinsyanos "Wag Ka Nang Umiyak" (You Don't Cry Anymore) and "Basta't Kasama Kita", On the Wings of Love and And I Love You Sos own title musics, and Nathaniels "Lupa Man Ay Langit Na Rin" (Even the Earth is Also Heaven), were compiled into one album.

The soundtrack album was released by Star Records on September 26, 2015, during It's Showtime Kapamilya Day, held at the Smart Araneta Coliseum.

Marketing
On August 1, 2015, ABS-CBN released the first teaser trailer for the series on YouTube, featuring Montes. Another teaser followed on August 5, and once again featuring Montes. Later that month, ABS-CBN released a series of exclusive posters and cast portraits on the show's website and Twitter. On August 14, 2015, the first full-length trailer was released. On April 22, 2016, it was publicly disclosed by Julia Montes and Sam Milby in their promotion and interview that the series got renewed for another book and season because of its consistently increasing ratings which have been unprecedentedly high for an afternoon cable series, beating its rival program and a rumor surfaces that the series might get extended until August which will run for totally a year. The trailer for the second book shows the new life of Kara and Sara as mothers, having daughters of their own. On April 29, 2016, Montes, with Alora Sasam and Markki Stroem, visited SM City San Jose del Monte and served a thanksgiving concert to everyone who watches and supports the series. A promotion about the extension for the series was also included. There is also a report that the series might run until February 10, 2017, because of its continuous high ratings.

Critical response

Doble Kara has been met with largely positive reviews from critics since its premiere, with most praising Julia Montes' performance. Walden Sadiri M. Belen of Manila Bulletin praised Mylene Dizon's dramatic prowess during the episodes of its pilot week and the veteran actress' addition to the series, saying, "Mylene's acting, well-supported by the performances of seasoned actors Ariel Rivera and even Allen Dizon, beefed-up the first week run of Doble Kara. Although, Julia Montes would appear on the fifth episode, Mylene and her co-stars have already built the anticipation and eagerness of viewers to the next journey of the twins as adults. Anchored on Mylene's strong performances, Doble Kara is an afternoon soap opera filled with an ensemble cast that will succeed in luring viewers for weeks to come." Furthermore, Belen said that despite the long wait before Montes' grown-up characters appear, he can already feel the young actress' different range of acting, adding, "The first starring role of Julia Montes, Dreamscape Entertainment Television went all out to make the series a success. In the short scenes of Julia, viewers can already see the different range of acting she possesses. Playing the insipidly weak, California educated Kara and the ambitious beauty queen and commercial model Sara."

Luciano also commended Carmina Villarroel's performance and said that she also effectively grabs attention for her portrayal of Lucille, the ambiguous and struggling character who can either be adored because of her maternal love or sympathized for her growing need to seek justice. 
Elvin Luciano of PEP.ph finds the character of John Lapus's Itoy as "innovative", saying, "It's refreshing to see a character like Itoy, played with subtlety and control by Lapus, the gay kumare who is oftentimes the voice of discord and not there as the token comic relief." 
However, "praises also goes to the fine young discovery, Avery Balasbas, who convincingly plays two different people girls with both skill and maturity," stated by Luciano.

On the other hand, Rocky Chua of TV Series Craze gave a positive review, writing, "Julia can effectively portray both the bida and the kontrabida roles which makes the story of Doble Kara more interesting and exciting. It even leads in the afternoon teleserye lineup of the Kapamilya network. And yes, the story of it is unpredictable!" On an added note, he said, "Unique story, unexpected twists, and best performance of the lead cast, Julia Montes, who is playing bida and kontrabida at the same time, makes Doble Kara one of our favorite teleseryes today. Viewers were truly hook to it!"

In Africa, the series was a massive success. It received much applause from audiences and critics alike for the role of Montes particularly as Sara Suarez. Carmina Villarroel and Maxene Magalona were also praised for their respective portrayals as Lucille and Alex. It aired along with The Promise (2015), with many saying that it edged the remake. It star rocketed Montes as both a lead protagonist and antagonist.

Ratings
Doble Karas premiere episode "Ang Simula" debuted on a high note on August 24, 2015, and scored a national TV rating of 16.9%, compared to its rival program in GMA's The Half Sisters which registered 15.6%, according to data from Kantar Media. Aside from winning the ratings game, Doble Kara also won the hearts of audiences as the #DobleKaraSimula quickly became a nationwide trending topic on Twitter because of the positive tweets posted by viewers about the show.

On April 12, 2016, Doble Kara received the highest national TV rating of 18.5% with its episode "Kara vs. Lucille – Part 2", placing 5th in the most watched program of that same day based on Kantar Media. On April 19, 2016, the series beat its previous all-time high rating, and garnered a national TV rating of 19.1% with its episode "Sakuna ng mga Suarez", placing 4th in the most watched program of that same day. On April 22, 2016, Doble Kara surpassed once again its previous all-time high rating and set a record for receiving the highest national TV rating of 19.3% with its season three finale, "Ang Kasal", placing 4th in the most watched program of that same day.

On May 24 and June 8, 2016, the second book and fourth season of the series conquered once again the afternoon programming and hit its new all-time high national TV ratings of 19.8% and 19.9% with its episodes "Hanap Isabella" and "May Kambal si Momma", respectively, as it won the hearts of the urban and rural viewers and sustained its lead over its rival shows. On June 9, 2016, the series beat its previous all-time high rating of 19.9% by setting a new record for receiving the highest national TV rating of 20.2% with its episode "Alex, Sisiraan si Sara", as it reached the 20% territory. On August 9, 2016, Doble Kara hits a new all-time high national TV rating of 20.3% with its episode "Wish ni Becca". On September 2, 2016, its previous record was replaced by its new all-time high national TV rating of 21.5% with its episode "Becca Tumakas", as it reached the 20% territory anew. On September 9, 2016, Doble Kara received a record-breaking and highest national TV rating of 21.7% with its episode "Si Becca ay si Isabella", placing 4th in the most watched program of that same day based on Kantar Media. On its sixth and last season's finale on February 10, 2017, Doble Kara broke its own record for receiving the highest national TV rating of 22.2% of any afternoon television series with its episode "Pagtatapos na Palaban", placing 5th in the most watched program of that day.

Accolades

See also
 List of programs broadcast by ABS-CBN
 List of telenovelas of ABS-CBN

References

External links
 

 
ABS-CBN drama series
Philippine melodrama television series
Philippine thriller television series
2015 Philippine television series debuts
2017 Philippine television series endings
Television series by Dreamscape Entertainment Television
Television shows set in Japan
Television shows set in the Philippines
Filipino-language television shows